The 2012 FIM Moto3 World Championship was a part of the 64th F.I.M. Road Racing World Championship season. It was the inaugural season of Moto3.

Season summary
The inaugural Moto3 world championship title went to German rider Sandro Cortese, following his fourth victory of the season at the Malaysian Grand Prix, which gave him an unassailable points lead over his two title rivals Luis Salom and Maverick Viñales in the championship race. Cortese also became the first rider to win any Grand Prix title for the Austrian manufacturer KTM. KTM also won the constructors' championship at the Australian Grand Prix, doing so after Cortese won the race.

Class changes
The 2012 season also saw the introduction of four-stroke bikes in the new Moto3 class.

Calendar
The following Grands Prix were scheduled to take place in 2012:

The Fédération Internationale de Motocyclisme released an 17-race provisional calendar on 14 September 2011. Another provisional calendar was released three months later, with the Qatar Grand Prix moved forward by a week.

 ‡ = Night race
 †† = Saturday race

Calendar changes
 The Czech Republic and Indianapolis Grand Prix swapped places.

Teams and riders
 A provisional entry list was released by the Fédération Internationale de Motocyclisme on 13 January 2012. All teams used Dunlop tyres.

Results and standings

Grands Prix

Riders' standings
Scoring system
Points were awarded to the top fifteen finishers. A rider had to finish the race to earn points.

Constructors' standings
Points were awarded to the top fifteen finishers. A rider had to finish the race to earn points.

 Each constructor got the same number of points as their best placed rider in each race.

References

2012 in Grand Prix motorcycle racing
2012 in motorcycle sport
Grand Prix motorcycle racing seasons